MV Bright Field was a bulk cargo ship that collided with the Riverwalk Marketplace shopping complex in New Orleans, Louisiana, on the afternoon of Saturday, December 14, 1996, after losing engine power.  The vessel was fully loaded with grain at the time of the incident.  The United States Coast Guard investigated the incident and published its findings on December 8, 1997, citing the cause of the engine failure as a poorly-maintained oil filter.  A secondary but contributory cause was determined to be a main-engine automation system that produced warnings and alarms that were not consistently relayed to the ship's Master.  The National Transportation Safety Board published its final report on January 13, 1998, which concurred with the Coast Guard's determinations and appear to charge the ship's operating company with the responsibility for the casualty.

The incident resulted in no deaths, but 66 people were injured.  Physical damage to the Bright Field was calculated at $1,857,952.  Damage to the Riverwalk, including the pier, condominium properties, shops and hotel, totaled an estimated $15 million.

The spot where the Bright Field ran into the Riverwalk is marked on site with a plaque.

The Bright Field was repaired immediately following the incident, and in 2000 was reportedly seen again in the New Orleans harbor bearing the name Bright Star.  In 2007, the vessel was renamed Bright City, operating under the Liberian flag, and carried a Chinese crew.

As of May 2010, it's been renamed Yong Xu Hai, under the Chinese flag.

Maritime Records show the ship has been decommissioned and scrapped.

References

External links

Compilation of photos, video, and maps of Bright Field collision with the Riverwalk Marketplace
MV Bright Field Engine Shutdown Explanation of the engine shutdown based on USCG report

Maritime incidents in 1996
1996 in the United States
20th century in New Orleans
1988 ships
1996 in Louisiana